Dommartin-lès-Remiremont (literally Dommartin near Remiremont) is a commune in the Vosges department in Grand Est in northeastern France. The archivist-palaeographer Michel François (1906–1981) was born in Dommartin.

See also
Communes of the Vosges department

References

External links

Official site

Communes of Vosges (department)